Navraj Hans is an Indian singer, actor, entrepreneur, cricket player and performer. He is the son of Hans Raj Hans and son-in-law of Daler Mehndi.

Musical career
Navraj Hans has done playback singing for several Bollywood and Punjabi movies. His song "Saiyaan" by Sony Music India featured in the Punjabi movie Burrraahh. His song "Jind meriye" is from the Bollywood movie Purani Jeans. In 2016, he sang "Sadi  Rail Gaddi" in film Tutak Tutak Tutiya. In 2018, he sang "Chote Chote Peg" with Neha Kakkar and "Yo Yo Honey Singh" for Sonu Ke Titu Ki Sweety, "Mundiyaan Tu Bachke" with Palak Muchhal for Baaghi 2, and "Rangdaari" with Arko Pravo Mukherjee for Daas Dev.

Acting career
Since 2013, Navraj has appeared in many Punjabi feature films. His acting debut was in Marriage Da Garriage. In 2015, his film Punjabian Da King was released. He also appeared in the Punjabi film Dil Le Gayi Kudi Punjab Di and the Bollywood film Band of Maharajas.

Filmography

Discography

Bollywood

Celebrity cricket league 
Navraj Hans is a player of the Punjab De Sher cricket team in the Celebrity Cricket League. With 13 sixes and 6 fours Navraj scored his first century in Punjab De Sher debut match against Mumbai heroes on 28 March 2015 at cricket stadium, Chandigarh, Punjab, India.

References

Punjabi-language lyricists
Male actors from Punjab, India
Living people
Year of birth missing (living people)
People from Jalandhar
Male actors in Punjabi cinema